Center Township is one of seventeen townships in Cedar County, Iowa, USA.  As of the 2000 census, its population was 3,945.

History
Center Township was established in 1841.

Geography
According to the USGS, it contains eighteen cemeteries: Bolton, Bradley, Center Ross, County Home, Eureka, Fairland, Goodale, Kiser, Masonic, Mount Zion, Ochiltree, Saint Marys, Sand Hill, Virginia Grove, Wood Bridge, Wood Bridge, Wright and York Prairie.

References

External links
 US-Counties.com
 City-Data.com

Townships in Cedar County, Iowa
Townships in Iowa
1841 establishments in Iowa Territory